Status Quo Live at the BBC is series of releases by English rock band Status Quo, issued by Universal Music on 24 October 2010. The release was available on a range of formats: 2-CD 'best of' collection, 4-CD box set and a limited edition collectors' 8-disc (7 CDs + 1 DVD) complete set.

About

Representing the last set of unreleased recordings in the Status Quo catalogue, the collection was collated not just from all of the BBC-owned Status Quo recordings that still exist in the archive, but also by inviting contributions from fans. Fans contributed home recordings of broadcasts that were wiped by BBC.

Track listing

2 Disc Edition

DISC ONE

BBC Sessions - As The Spectres:
 Gloria
 I (Who Have Nothing)
[Saturday Club 10/9/66]

BBC Sessions - As Traffic Jam:
 Almost But Not Quite There
[Saturday Club 24/6/67]

BBC Sessions - As Status Quo: 
 Judy In Disguise
 Pictures Of Matchstick Men
['David Symonds' - Recorded 16/1/68. Transmitted 22/1/68]

 Black Veils Of Melancholy
[David Symonds' - Recorded 29/3/68] Ice In The Sun
'''[David Symonds' - Saturday Club 30/7/68]

 Price Of Love[Symonds On Sunday' - Recorded 27/1/69] Down The Dustpipe
 In My Chair
[Dave Lee Travis' - Recorded 6/4/70] Mean Girl
'''[Sounds Of The Seventies' - Recorded 7/2/72. Transmitted 3/3/72]

 Paper Plane[Sounds Of The Seventies' - Recorded 20/11/72. Transmitted 7/12/72. Programme Number: 00YJ3738]

 From A Jack To A King
 Railroad
[Steve Wright 30/11/89]

 Caroline	
 Whatever You Want
 Rockin All Over The World
[Ken Bruce - 09/09/2005]	

DISC TWO

Paris Theatre, London Recorded 1/3/73 - 'In Concert 
 Junior's Wailing
 In My Chair
 Don't Waste My Time
 Paper Plane
 Bye Bye Johnny	

Wembley Arena Recorded 7/7/88 - 'In Concert' 
 What Ever You Want
 Roll Over Lay Down
 Who Gets The Love?
 Don't Drive My Car
 In The Army Now

Sutton Park, Birmingham Recorded 30/8/92
 Burning Bridges
 Caroline

Brighton Centre 12/12/1996
 The Wanderer
 Don't Waste My Time
 Rockin All Over The World

4 Disc Box Set

DISC ONE: IN SESSION

As The Spectres:
 Gloria
 I Who Have Nothing
 Neighbour Neighbour
[Saturday Club 10/9/66]

As Traffic Jam:
 I Don't Want You
 Almost But Not Quite There
 Spicks and Specks
[Saturday Club 24/6/67]

As Status Quo:
 Spicks And Specks
 Judy In Disguise
 Pictures Of Matchstick Men
['David Symonds' - Recorded 16/1/68. Transmitted 22/1/68]

 Things Get Better
 Pictures of Matchstick Men
['Saturday Club' - Recorded 13/268. Transmitted 17/2/68]

 Gloria
 Blood Hound
 Black Veils Of Melancholy
['David Symonds' - Recorded 29/3/68]

 Ice In The Sun
 Paradise Flats
 When My Mind Is Not Life
['Saturday Club' - Recorded 30/7/68]

 Make Me Stay A Bit Longer
 Are You Growing Tired of My Love?
 Price Of Love
 Price of My Love
['Symonds On Sunday' - Recorded 27/1/69]

 Juniors Wailing
 Spinning Wheel Blues
 Down The Dustpipe
 In My Chair
['Dave Lee Travis' - Recorded 6/4/70]	

DISC TWO

 Need Your Love
['Dave Lee Travis' - Recorded 15/6/70]

 Mean Girl
 Railroad
['Sounds Of The Seventies' - Recorded 7/2/72. Transmitted 3/3/72]

 Don't Waste My Time
 Oh Baby
 Unspoken Words
 Paper Plane
 Softer Ride
['Sounds Of The Seventies' - Recorded 20/11/72. Transmitted 7/12/72]

 Paper Plane
 Softer Ride
 Don't Waste My Time
['John Peel' - Recorded 8/1/73. Transmitted 16/1/73]

 In My Chair
 Caroline
 From A Jack To A King
 Down The Dustpipe
 Railroad
[Steve Wright 30/11/89]

 Caroline
 The Party Ain't Over Yet
 Whatever You Want
 Belavista Man:
 Rockin All Over The World
[Ken Bruce Date: 09/09/2005]

DISC THREE: CONCERTS

Paris Theatre, London Recorded 1/3/73 - 'In Concert'
 Junior's Wailing
 Someone's Learning	
 In My Chair
 Railroad
 Don't Waste My Time
 Paper Plane
 Roadhouse Blues
 Bye Bye Johnny	

Wembley Arena Recorded 7/7/88 - 'In Concert' 
 Whatever You Want
 Little Lady
 Roll Over Lay Down
 Cream Of The Crop
 Don't Drive My Car
 In The Army Now

DISC FOUR: CONCERTS (con't)

Sutton Park, Birmingham Recorded 30/8/92
 Burning Bridges
 Rockin' All Over The World
 Roadhouse Blues/The Wanderer/Marguerita Time/Living On An Island/Break The Rules/Something 'Bout You Baby I Like/The Price Of Love/Roadhouse Blues
 Caroline

Brighton Centre, 12/12/1996 
 The Wanderer
 Proud Mary	
 Wild Side Of Life / Rolling Home / Again & Again / Slow Train
 Get Back
 Something About You Baby I Like
 Don't Waste My Time
 Rockin All Over The World
 Caroline
 All Around My Hat (with Maddy Prior)

Complete 7 CD + 1 DVD collection

DISC ONE: IN SESSION

As The Spectres:
 Gloria
 I (Who Have Nothing)
 Neighbour, Neighbour
 Bloodhound
 Bird Dog
[Saturday Club 10/9/66]

As Traffic Jam:
 I Don't Want You
 Almost But Not Quite There
 Spicks and Specks
 It Takes Two
[Saturday Club 24/6/67]

As Status Quo:
 Spicks And Specks
 Judy in Disguise (With Glasses)
 Pictures Of Matchstick Men [This is not the version from the David Symonds Show but the version from Saturday Club 17/2/68 though faded slightly earlier. The version from the Symonds show is featured on a Top Of The Pops transcription disc #171]
['David Symonds' - Recorded 16/1/68. Transmitted 22/1/68]

 Things Get Better
 Pictures of Matchstick Men
['Saturday Club' - Recorded 13/2/68. Transmitted 17/2/68]

 Gloria
 Bloodhound
 Black Veils Of Melancholy
['David Symonds' - Recorded 29/3/68]

 Ice In The Sun
 Paradise Flat
 When My Mind Is Not Live
['Saturday Club' - Recorded 30/7/68]

 Make Me Stay A Bit Longer
 Are You Growing Tired of My Love
 The Price Of Love
['Symonds On Sunday' - Recorded 27/1/69]

 The Price Of Love
['Symonds On Sunday' - Recorded 31/3/69]

 Junior's Wailing [This is actually from the Tony Brandon Show tx. 18.08.69 as featured on Top Of The Pops transcription disc #251]
 Spinning Wheel Blues
 Down The Dustpipe
 In My Chair
['Dave Lee Travis' - Recorded 6/4/70]	

DISC TWO
 Need Your Love
['Dave Lee Travis' - Recorded 15/6/70]

 Mean Girl
 Railroad
['Sounds Of The Seventies' - Recorded 7/2/72. Transmitted 3/3/72]

 Don't Waste My Time
 Oh Baby
 Unspoken Words
 Paper Plane
 Softer Ride
['Sounds Of The Seventies' - Recorded 20/11/72. Transmitted 7/12/72]

 Paper Plane
 Softer Ride
 Don't Waste My Time
['John Peel' - Recorded 8/1/73. Transmitted 16/1/73]

 In My Chair
 Caroline
 From A Jack To A King
 Down The Dustpipe
 Railroad
[Steve Wright 30/11/89]

 Caroline	
 The Party Ain't Over Yet
 Whatever You Want
 Belavista Man	
 Rockin' All Over The World
[Ken Bruce 09/09/2005]

DISC THREE: CONCERTS

Paris Theatre, London Recorded 1/3/73.

 Junior's Wailing
 Someone's Learning
 In My Chair
 Railroad
 Don't Waste My Time
 Paper Plane
 Roadhouse Blues
 Bye Bye Johnny

N.E.C. Birmingham Recorded 14/5/82. - 'Friday Rock Show' (first time the complete show has been available)

 Caroline
 Roll Over Lay Down
 Backwater
 Little Lady
 Don't Drive My Car

DISC FOUR

N.E.C. Birmingham Recorded 14.5.82. - 'Friday Rock Show' (first time the complete show has been available)
 Whatever You Want
 Hold You Back
 Rockin' All Over The World
 Over The Edge
 Don't Waste My Time
 Dirty Water
 4500 Times
 Big Fat Mama
 Roadhouse Blues
 Rain
 Down Down
 Bye Bye Johnny

DISC FIVE

Wembley Arena Recorded 7.7.88. 
 Whatever You Want
 Little Lady
 Roll Over Lay Down
 Cream Of The Crop
 Who Gets The Love?
 Hold You Back
 Don't Drive My Car
 Dirty Water
 In The Army Now
 Rockin' All Over The World
 Don't Waste My Time
 Bye Bye Johnny

DISC SIX

Sutton Park, Birmingham Recorded 30.8.92 - 'Party In The Park'

 Whatever You Want
 In The Army Now
 Burning Bridges
 Rockin' All Over The World
 Caroline
 Roadhouse Blues/The Wanderer/Marguerita Time/Living On An Island/Break The Rules/Something 'Bout You Baby I Like/The Price Of Love/Roadhouse Blues

DISC SEVEN

Brighton Centre, 12/12/1996
 Paper Plane
 The Wanderer
 Proud Mary
 Wild Side Of Life /Rollin' Home/Again And Again/Slow Train
 Get Back
 Whatever You Want
 In The Army Now
 Something 'Bout You Baby I Like
 Don't Waste My Time
 Rockin All Over The World
 Roadhouse Blues
 Caroline
 All Around My Hat (with Maddy Prior)

DISC EIGHT: DVD

NEC Birmingham [14/05/1982]
 Caroline
 Roll Over Lay Down
 Backwater
 Little Lady
 Don't Drive My Car
 Whatever You Want
 Hold You Back
 Rockin' All Over The World [06/03/1999]
 Dirty Water
 Down Down
 Don't Waste My Time

Top Of The Pops:
 Pictures Of Matchstick Men [15/02/1968]
 Caroline (3:40) [27/09/1973]
 Down Down (3:13) [23/12/1975]
 Mystery Song (3:00) [15/07/1976]
 What You're Proposing (3:46) [09/10/1980]
 Rock 'n' Roll' (3:00) [17/12/1981]
 Dear John (3:00) [01/04/1982]
 The Wanderer (3:22) [25/10/1984]
 Rollin' Home [15/05/1986]
 Red Sky [07/08/1986]
 In The Army Now [02/10/1986]
 Dreamin' [01/01/1987]
 Burning Bridges [08/12/1988]
 Let's Work Together [03/10/1991]
 Jam Side Down [16/08/2002]
 Rockin All Over the World [13/09/2002]
 The Party Ain't Over Yet[18/09/2005]

Other/Bonus BBC Performances:
 Old Grey Whistle Test Interview
 A Mess Of Blues [19/11/1983] ~ Saturday Superstore
 Marguerita Time (3:22) [05/01/1984] ~ Little & Large Show
 Can't Give You More [28/08/1991] ~ Wogan
 Old Time Rock n Roll~ Jim Davidson Presents
 Road House Medley (Live From Amsterdam)
 Rock Till You Drop (3:20) [13/01/1992] ~ Pebble Mill
 Medley (Caroline/Down Down/Whatever/Rockin) (5:14) [21/11/1998] ~ The Generation Game (Jim Davidson)

References

Live blues rock albums
Status Quo (band) live albums
Live hard rock albums
2010 live albums